The Adventure Show is a sport programme produced by Adventure Show Productions for BBC Sport Scotland, formerly broadcast on BBC Two Scotland and since 2019 on BBC Scotland. It is hosted  by Dougie Vipond. In the show's original format, Vipond was supported on screen by reporters Duncan McCallum and Deziree Wilson, while Cameron McNeish contributed a regular mountain walking slot. When the series transferred to BBC Scotland in 2019, the show was reformatted as a weekly two-hour programme branded as The Adventure Show Live (or The Adventure Show Extreme for pre-recorded editions) and concentrating on one specific sport in each edition, in contrast to the previous magazine format. The new presenting team comprised Vipond, Patrick Winterton (who serves as lead commentator) and Lauren McCallum.

The show's main focus is on "adventure" sports, usually concentrating on one or two main events in each edition. Sports featured include climbing, kayaking, sailing, windsurfing and kitesurfing, various forms of bicycle racing, and cross-country running, especially ultramarathon and multi-discipline events. The show also includes features on people working in the adventure sports industry, such as medical crews and instructors. In its original format, camping tips, including consumer reviews and items on outdoor cookery, were often featured during spring and summer.

From time to time, the show would feature either Vipond, McCallum or Wilson taking part in a long-distance event to give the viewer an idea of what is involved. In 2012, Wilson achieved a third-place finish in the women's section at the Isle of Arran Goat Fell hill race while reporting for the programme.

The Adventure Show special, The Great Climb, broadcast live on 28 August 2010, won a Scottish BAFTA Award for Live Event Coverage.

External links
 

BBC Scotland television shows
2000s Scottish television series
2010s Scottish television series
2020s Scottish television series
2005 Scottish television series debuts
2005 establishments in Scotland
Sports television in Scotland
2000s British sports television series
2010s British sports television series
2020s British sports television series